In 1960-61 the South Africa national rugby union team toured England, France, Ireland, Scotland, and Wales, playing  a series of test matches, as well as games against club, regional, and representative teams. South Africa won a Grand Slam by winning their test matches against all four Home Nations sides, as well as the test against France. This was the fifth Springboks tour of the Northern Hemisphere.

Results
Scores and results list South Africa's points tally first.

Bibliography

References

1960 rugby union tours
1961 rugby union tours
1960
1960
1960
1960
1960
1960
1960 in South African rugby union
1961 in South African rugby union
1960–61 in French rugby union
1960–61 in English rugby union
1960–61 in Welsh rugby union
1960–61 in Scottish rugby union
1960–61 in Irish rugby union